Sirayil Pootha Chinna Malar is a 1990 Indian Tamil-language action drama film, directed by Amirtham and produced by M. Gopi. The film stars Vijayakanth, Bhanupriya, Shantipriya and Rajesh. It was released on 20 July 1990.

Plot 
Muthappa, a poor singer falls in love with the sister of a cruel landlord Rajalingam. After surviving a murder attempt, Muthappa marries his ladylove. He is shocked to learn that Rajalingam has had a change of heart thereby accepting the relation. However, that night Muttappa and his wife are shifted to a secret and separate prisons by her brother, an evil landlord in such a way that they can never meet each other. After the incident he forbids love in the village and also closes the temple where his sister's marriage was conducted. People forget the presumably dead Muthappa.

Several years later, Parthiban, a courageous young man arrives in the village openly defying the laws of the landlord. He reopens the village temple and helps in uniting lovers. He even humiliates the arrogant children of the landlord much to his anger. On a journey the landlord who hears the long forgotten song of Muthappa confronts the singer who happens to be Parthiban and is shocked to find his similarities to Muthappa.

Who is Parthiban? Is he related to Muthappa? Will Muthappa escape from the prison? What happens later forms the crux of the story.

Cast 

Vijayakanth Muthappa / Parthiban
Bhanupriya as Chitra
Shantipriya as Mangamma
Rajesh as Rajalingam
S. S. Chandran
Jayabharathi as Chitra's Mother
Tara as Muthappa's wife
Thyagu as Chitra's Brother
Charle
R. Shankaran as Yanai Pandithar
Kokila
Sivaraman
S. A. Kannan
Azhagu
Manoj
Abhinaya
Vani
Latha
Ushapriya
Premi

Production 
Sirayil Pootha Chinna Malar was the home production of Bhanupriya. Amirtham made his directorial comeback with this film after Thooku Medai (1982).

Soundtrack 
The music was composed by Ilaiyaraaja.

Reception 
NKS of The Indian Express wrote ,"Directed by Amirtham, the film follows the traditional manner of narration".

References

External links 
 

1990 films
1990s action drama films
1990s Tamil-language films
Films scored by Ilaiyaraaja
Indian action drama films